Emma J. Virján is an American author and illustrator of children's picture books. Books in her Pig in a Wig series have been included in the 2016 New York Public Library's Best Books for Kids and the Texas 2x2 Reading List; and won awards including the Maryland Blue Crab Young Reader Award.

Publishers Weekly gave a starred review to the opening book of Virján's Pig in a Wig series, stating “In a story with the echoes of Seuss and Willems, Virján offers a very funny lesson about the unreliability of narrators.” And Kirkus Reviews concluded “A boatload of giggles will keep the reader returning for more easy-to-read fun.”

Biography 
Virján was born in San Antonio, Texas. She earned a Bachelor of Fine Arts in Communication Arts from Texas State University, and is currently based in Austin.

Books 
 Nacho the Party Puppy (Random House Books for Young Readers, 2008)
 What This Story Needs is a Pig in a Wig (HarperCollins, 2015)
 What This Story Needs is a Hush and a Shush (HarperCollins, 2016)
 What This Story Needs is a Munch and a Crunch (HarperCollins, 2016)
 What This Story Needs is a Bang and a Clang (HarperCollins, 2017)

References

External links 
Emma J. Virján official website

Living people
American children's writers
Writers from San Antonio
American women children's writers
Year of birth missing (living people)
21st-century American writers
21st-century American women writers
American children's book illustrators
Texas State University alumni